The National Centre for Commando Training, is a  located in Mont-Louis and Collioure in the Pyrenees-Orientales department, and is part of the .

History
Created on the 1st January 1964, as a descendant of the 11e régiment parachutiste de choc, the National Centre for Commando Training is a unique establishment that specialises in commando training in France.

With the return of the French troops from Algeria in 1961, it was recognised that the training methods of the shock troops were highly effective for modern warfare. Thus ten centres were created in Metropolitan France and Germany, most often in austere fortifications.

After being established in 1964, the CNEC de Mont-Louis and Collioure trained cadres of the French Army and also received special forces and foreign trainees from United Kingdom, Germany, Belgium, Spain, the United States, and Morocco.

Training
After three weeks of training in a CEC, an entire unit is awarded the  badge, flanked by the number associated with the centre (Number 1 for CNEC).
For NCOs, after five weeks at the CNEC, they are awarded the gold  badge.
For Officers, after eight weeks at the CNEC, they are awarded the gold  badge.

Flag
Corsica 1943
Elba Island 1944
Cape Negro - Toulon 1944
Upper Alsace 1944-1945
Indochina 1947-1948 1951-1954
AFN 1952–1962.

References

French Army
Military education and training in France
Commando training facilities
Training establishments of the French Army
1964 establishments in France